The men's 3 metre springboard was one of eight diving events included in the Diving at the 2004 Summer Olympics programme.

The competition was split into three phases:

Preliminary round 23 August — Each diver performed a front dive, a back dive, a reverse dive, an inward dive, a twisting dive and a sixth free-choice dive from one of these groups. There were no limitations in degree of difficulty. The 18 divers with the highest total score advanced to the semi-final.
Semi-final 24 August — Each diver performed a front dive, a back dive, a reverse dive, an inward dive and a twisting dive. The overall difficulty degree was limited to 9.5. The 12 divers with the highest combined score from the semi-final and preliminary dives advanced to the final.
Final 24 August — Each diver performed a front dive, a back dive, a reverse dive, an inward dive, a twisting dive and a sixth free-choice dive from one of these groups. There were no limitations in difficulty degree. The final ranking was determined by the combined score from the final and semi-final dives.

Results

References

Sources

Men's 03m
2004
Men's events at the 2004 Summer Olympics